Reksoft is an offshore software engineering company specialising in software development and system integration services, specifically software product engineering, enterprise application services and dedicated centres. Reksoft has passed certification audit ISO 9001:2008, and is assessed to comply with CMMi Level 5. The company is based in St. Petersburg, Russia, and has regional offices in Stockholm, Sweden, and development centres in Moscow and Voronezh, Russia.

In 2008, Technoserv, one of the leading players in the Russian IT market, acquired a 74% stake in Reksoft.

Clients
As of April 2021, Reksoft has served over 1000 companies worldwide, including T-Systems, Cadbury, Fujitsu, Gazprom, Mazda, Philip Morris International, Mavenir Systems, Springer Business+Science Media, Tieto, Lenze, Aastra, Alert Logic, FXDD, Agora Freight and Vimpelcom.

Ranking 
In 2009, Reksoft was awarded the rank of Rising Star by the International Association of Outsourcing Professionals. In the same year, Reksoft was listed as one of the top 20 Russian IT service providers.
In 2010, Reksoft was listed in the 2010 Global Services 100 List
In 2011, Reksoft was listed in the 2011 Global Services 100 List».

In 2012, Reksoft was listed in the 2012 Global Services 100 List». This year Reksoft was also awarded the rank of Rising Star by the International Association of Outsourcing Professionals.

In 2020, Reksoft was named one of the Top 100 Western European developers by industry ranking platform Clutch

History
 1991: Reksoft is co-founded by Alexander Egorov with two friends from Saint Petersburg State University of Aerospace Instrumentation.
 1992: Reksoft wins first international contract, with Swiss telecommunications concern Ascom Infrasys. Reksoft has been developing software for Ascom’s Telecom Solutions and PBX divisions ever since.
2000: Reksoft business processes are assessed to comply with ISO 9001:2000 certifications
2001: Reksoft opens in-house training centre where undergraduate students take courses in software development, testing and project management.
2003: Reksoft opens regional sales office in Stockholm, Sweden, and a development centre in Moscow, Russia.
2005: MartinsonTrigon, a Nordic venture capitalist company, has invested 2 million dollars into Reksoft. The investment was used with the purpose to secure the growth strategies of Reksoft.
2006: Reksoft assessed to comply with CMMi Level 4
2007: Reksoft opens regional sales office in Munich, Germany.
2008: Reksoft joins TechnoServ A/S, Russia's largest system integrator, and opens a development centre in Voronezh, Russia.
2009: Reksoft passes certification audit ISO 9001:2008 and is assessed to comply with CMMi Level 5.
2010: Reksoft is listed in the 2010 Global Services 100. Company joins Climate Savers Computing Initiative.
2011: Reksoft is listed in the 2011 Global Services 100.
2012: Reksoft is listed in the 2012 Global Services 100.
2013: Reksoft awarded Rising Stars status IAOP 2013 Global Outsourcing Ranking

References

External links
http://www.reksoft.com

Software companies of Russia
Companies based in Saint Petersburg
Russian companies established in 1991
Software companies established in 1991
Russian brands
Multinational companies headquartered in Russia